Scopula planidisca is a moth of the  family Geometridae. It is found in Peninsular Malaysia.

References

Moths described in 1908
planidisca
Moths of Asia